Leeds is a village in the western portion of the city of Northampton, Massachusetts, United States, bordering Williamsburg—along the Mill River—and Florence.  The ZIP Code for Leeds is 01053.

The village was named after the city of Leeds, in England. In the 19th century, Leeds was known for its textile manufacturing, including broadcloth, silk, and vegetable ivory buttons, as well as extensive manufacturing of farm implements and household goods.

The major producer of silk in Leeds was the Corticelli Silk Mills, which were owned by the Nonotuck Silk Company. They had several buildings along sections of the Mill River. The major factory was located at the corner of Main Street and Mulberry Street, another factory building was located across the bridge and to the right of Chartpak. Another building was located near the opposite end of Main Street, where the cocoons were steamed to loosen the fibers and made the raw silk usable for production in Corticelli's various products. The company also created items that could be used in the classroom as teaching aids, including a poster showing the various steps in the production of silk.

In 1874, a dam on the Mill River broke, flooding Leeds and Williamsburg and killing 139 people.

Today, Leeds is home to the Northampton Veterans Affairs Medical Center, and Chartpak, manufacturer of art and graphics supplies, which includes Koh-i-Noor Hardtmuth.

Leeds is also home to Leeds Elementary School.

References 

 In the Shadow of the Dam, The Aftermath of the Mill River Flood of 1874, Elizabeth M. Sharpe, Free Press, 2004.
 Silk: Its Origin, Culture, and Manufacture; Illustrated from Photographs Taken at the Corticelli Silk Mills, Nonotuck Silk Company, 1902
 How Corticelli Silk Is Made, Nonotuck Silk Company, 1881
 Mills on the Mill River, Charles J. Dean, 1935

External links 
 Leeds Civic Association

Northampton, Massachusetts
Springfield metropolitan area, Massachusetts
Villages in Hampshire County, Massachusetts
Villages in Massachusetts